Galeville is a hamlet (and census-designated place) in Onondaga County, New York, United States. The population was 4,617 at the 2010 census.

The community is a northwestern suburb of Syracuse, located in the eastern end of the town of Salina.

Geography
Galeville is located at  (43.088816, -76.178631).

Galeville is north of Onondaga Lake and borders Ley Creek, which flows into the lake. Interstate 81 passes through the eastern side of the community and intersects the New York State Thruway (Interstate 90) north of Galeville.

Demographics

As of the census of 2000, there were 4,476 people, 2,040 households, and 1,205 families residing in the CDP. The population density was 3,922.4 per square mile (1,516.0/km2). There were 2,104 housing units at an average density of 1,843.8/sq mi (712.6/km2). The racial makeup of the CDP was 91.76% White, 3.87% African American, 0.63% Native American, 1.52% Asian, 0.04% Pacific Islander, 0.56% from other races, and 1.63% from two or more races. Hispanic or Latino of any race were 1.27% of the population.

There were 2,040 households, out of which 21.7% had children under the age of 18 living with them, 42.6% were married couples living together, 12.0% had a female householder with no husband present, and 40.9% were non-families. 35.2% of all households were made up of individuals, and 19.6% had someone living alone who was 65 years of age or older. The average household size was 2.17 and the average family size was 2.78.

In the CDP, the population was spread out, with 19.0% under the age of 18, 6.1% from 18 to 24, 28.1% from 25 to 44, 19.7% from 45 to 64, and 27.0% who were 65 years of age or older. The median age was 43 years. For every 100 females, there were 85.6 males. For every 100 females age 18 and over, there were 81.0 males. The most famous person being Richard J. Pabst.

The median income for a household in the CDP was $36,569, and the median income for a family was $44,219. Males had a median income of $31,783 versus $25,878 for females. The per capita income for the CDP was $22,407. About 6.6% of families and 7.5% of the population were below the poverty line, including 11.9% of those under age 18 and 4.9% of those age 65 or over.

Emergency Services
Galeville is protected by the Liverpool Fire Department, an all-volunteer agency, whose fire station #2 is located at 1029 7th North Street.

References

Census-designated places in New York (state)
Hamlets in New York (state)
Syracuse metropolitan area
Census-designated places in Onondaga County, New York
Hamlets in Onondaga County, New York